Eddie Burbanks (1 April 1913 – 26 July 1983) was an English footballer who played for Sunderland as a left winger. He was born in Campsall, England.

Club career
Burbanks made his debut for Sunderland on 27 April 1935 in a 4–1 win against Portsmouth at Roker Park, where he scored one goal. In Sunderland's first FA Cup win in 1937, Burbanks scored the third goal to wrap up the victory. He also won the 1936 FA Charity Shield. In his 156 appearances for Sunderland, he scored 30 goals. He subsequently played for Hull City, before making 13 appearances for Leeds United between 1953 and 1954, scoring once. He retired in 1954.

References

1913 births
English footballers
Sunderland A.F.C. players
Hull City A.F.C. players
Leeds United F.C. players
1983 deaths
Association football wingers
FA Cup Final players